Gothic Place is a grade II listed house at 5, 7 and 9 Dury Road, Monken Hadley, England.

References

External links

Grade II listed buildings in the London Borough of Barnet
Houses in the London Borough of Barnet
Monken Hadley